Boris Georgiyevich Tatushin (31 March 1933 in Moscow;  – 15 January 1998 in Moscow) was a Soviet football player and manager.

Honours
 Olympic champion: 1956.
 Soviet Top League winner: 1953, 1956, 1958.

International career
Tatushin made his debut for USSR on 8 September 1954 in a friendly against Sweden. He played in the 1958 FIFA World Cup qualifiers, but was not selected for the final tournament squad, because he was arrested with Eduard Streltsov and Mikhail Ogonkov over rape allegations and was disqualified for three years.

References

External links
  Profile

1933 births
1998 deaths
Russian footballers
Soviet footballers
Soviet Union international footballers
Olympic footballers of the Soviet Union
Footballers at the 1956 Summer Olympics
Olympic gold medalists for the Soviet Union
Soviet Top League players
FC Spartak Moscow players
Soviet football managers
Olympic medalists in football
FC Oryol managers
FC Khimik-Arsenal managers
Medalists at the 1956 Summer Olympics

Association football forwards